In Romania, the standard time is Eastern European Time (EET; UTC+02:00). Daylight saving time, which moves one hour ahead to UTC+03:00 is observed from the last Sunday in March to the last Sunday in October.

Daylight saving time 
Daylight saving time (DST) in Romania (locally known by "Ora de Vară") was originally introduced in 1932 (between 22 May and 2 October). Between 1933 and 1940, DST started on the first Sunday in April and ended on the first Sunday in October. DST was abandoned in 1941 and reintroduced in 1979. Since 1996, with a few exceptions, DST in Romania has followed the European Union rules.

Time notation 
The 24-hour clock is used for official purposes, including transport schedules, however in everyday conversation Romanians commonly use the 12-hour clock.

IANA time zone database 
In the IANA time zone database, Romania is given one zone in the file zone.tab – Europe/Bucharest. Data for Romania directly from zone.tab of the IANA time zone database; columns marked with * are the columns from zone.tab itself:

See also 
Time in Europe
List of time zones by country
List of time zones by UTC offset

References

External links 
Current time in Romania at Time.is